This is a list of listed buildings in the parish of Fodderty in Highland, Scotland. This includes the villages of Strathpeffer and Maryburgh and surrounding areas.

List 

|}

Key

See also 
 List of listed buildings in Highland

Notes

References
 All entries, addresses and coordinates are based on data from Historic Scotland. This data falls under the Open Government Licence

Fodderty